The 64th District of the Iowa House of Representatives is an electoral district in northeastern portion of Iowa.

Current elected officials
Chad Ingels is the representative currently representing the district.

Past representatives
The district has previously been represented by:
 June Franklin, 1971–1973
 John H. Connors, 1973–1983
 Harold Van Maanen, 1983–1993
 Gordon Burke, 1993–1995
 Beverly Nelson, 1995–2001
 Mark Smith, 2001–2003
 Janet Petersen, 2003–2013
 Bruce Bearinger, 2013–2021
 Chad Ingels, 2021–present

References

064